This is a list of lakes of South Africa. It includes lakes that were formed naturally, and a few wetlands. For artificial lakes such as reservoirs, refer to List of dams and reservoirs in South Africa. For estuaries (river mouths) see List of estuaries of South Africa, or if they are more the lagoon type List of lagoons of South Africa, and for bays see List of bays of South Africa.

 A  Subterranean lake
 B  The name Sout Pan literally translates as Salt Pan, but the lake is not used to harvest salt.

See also 

 List of estuaries of South Africa
 List of rivers of South Africa
 List of dams and reservoirs in South Africa
 List of lagoons of South Africa
 List of bays of South Africa
 Ports and harbours in South Africa

References

South Africa
Lakes
Lakes